Bojan Veličković (born December 18, 1988) is a Serbian mixed martial artist and sambist currently competing in the Welterweight division. A professional competitor since 2010, he has competed for the UFC, Professional Fighters League, and RFA, where he was the Welterweight Champion.

Background
Born and raised in Novi Sad, Serbia, Veličković began training in judo at the age of ten, before transitioning to Muay Thai at 14. Then at the age of 22, he began training in Brazilian Jiu-Jitsu and mixed martial arts. In Muay Thai, Veličković holds a record of 14–2.

Mixed martial arts career

Early career
Veličković was a gold medalist in amateur MMA at the FILA World Wrestling Federation before making his professional debut in 2010 as part of the "Road to the Ring of Fire" reality show. Veličković won all four fights and the show. He then began competing for the Tesla Fighting Championship in his native Serbia, where he was also Welterweight champion.

Resurrection Fighting Alliance
After compiling a professional record of 9–2, Veličković signed with the promotion in 2014. After losing his promotional debut to former UFC competitor and Ultimate Fighter Season 17 contestant Gilbert Smith, he won his next four fights with the promotion, capturing the Welterweight Championship in his final fight before signing with the UFC.

Ultimate Fighting Championship
Veličković signed with the UFC after compiling a record of 13–3 first and relocating to Colorado.

Veličković made his promotional debut against Alessio Di Chirico on April 10, 2016 at UFC Fight Night 86. He won the fight via unanimous decision (29–28, 29–28, and 30–27).

Veličković next faced Michael Graves on July 30, 2016 at UFC 201. The bout was declared a majority draw.

Veličković faced Sultan Aliev on December 17, 2016 at UFC on Fox 22. He lost the fight via split decision.

Veličković faced Nico Musoke on May 28, 2017 at UFC Fight Night 109. He won the fight by knockout in the third round. This win also earned Veličković his first Performance of the Night bonus award.

Veličković fought Darren Till on September 2, 2017 at UFC Fight Night: Struve vs. Volkov, losing the bout in a unanimous decision.

Veličković faced Jake Matthews on November 19, 2017 at UFC Fight Night 121. He lost the fight via split decision, and was subsequently released from the promotion.

PFL
After the release from the UFC, Veličković signed with Professional Fighters League, participating the inaugural season's welterweight bracket. He advanced from the regular season to quarterfinals where he eventually was eliminated, but was brought back to semifinals due to an injury of Abubakar Nurmagomedov. He lost the semifinal bout against Magomed Magomedkerimov via second round knockout.

Veličković also participated in the 2019 season of the Professional Fighters League, ending up losing both of his regular season bouts and not advancing to the playoffs.

Post-PFL career
Veličković was expected to face Escley Araujo at Serbian Battle Championship 27 on March 14, 2020. However, Araujo withdrew from the bout due to an injury and was replaced by Danillo Santos. Veličković won the fight via second-round submission.

Veličković then challenged Vladislav Kanchev for the SBC Welterweight Championship at Serbian Battle Championship 29 on November 7, 2020. He won the fight via unanimous decision.

OKTAGON
As the first bout of his three-fight contract with OKTAGON MMA, Veličković faced Emmanuel Dawa at OKTAGON 25 on June 19, 2021. He won the fight via technical knockout after the first round.

In his sophomore appearance he faced Carlo Prater at OKTAGON 27 on September 11, 2021. He won the fight via first-round technical knockout.

Veličković faced David Kozma for the Oktagon MMA Welterweight Championship on December 4, 2021 at Oktagon 29. He lost the bout via TKO in the 4th round.

Veličković faced Máté Kertész on March 26, 2022 at Oktagon Prime 5. He won the bout via unanimous decision.

Veličković faced Leandro Silva on October 15, 2022 at Oktagon 36. He lost the bout via split decision.

Veličković faced Ion Surdu on March 4, 2023 at Oktagon 40 in the Oktagon Welterweight Tournament Round of 16, winning the anaconda choke in the first round.

Championships and accomplishments
 Resurrection Fighting Alliance
Welterweight Champion
Tesla Fighting Championship
Middleweight Champion
Ultimate Fighting Championship
Performance of the Night (One time) vs. Nico Musoke
 Serbian Battle Championship
SBC Welterweight Championship (one time; current)

Mixed martial arts record
 

|-
|Win
|align=center|22–12–2
|Ion Surdu
|
|OKTAGON 40
|
|align=center|1
|align=center|2:55
|Ostrava, Czech Republic
|
|-
|Loss
|align=center|21–12–2
|Leandro Silva
|Decision (split)
|OKTAGON 36
|
|align=center|3
|align=center|5:00
|Frankfurt, Germany
|
|-
|Win
|align=center|21–11–2
|Máté Kertész
|Decision (unanimous)
|OKTAGON Prime 5
|
|align=center|3
|align=center|5:00
|Samorin, Slovakia
|
|-
|Loss
|align=center|20–11–2
|David Kozma
|TKO (punches)
|OKTAGON 29
|
|align=center|4
|align=center|3:16
|Ostrava, Czech Republic
|
|-
|Win
|align=center|20–10–2
|Carlo Prater
|TKO (punches)
|OKTAGON 27
|
|align=center|1
|align=center|2:44
|Bratislava, Slovakia
|
|-
|Win
|align=center|19–10–2
|Emmanuel Dawa
|TKO (doctor stoppage)
|OKTAGON 25
|
|align=center|1
|align=center|5:00
|Brno, Czech Republic
|
|-
|Win
|align=center|18–10–2
|Vladislav Kanchev
|Decision (unanimous)
|Serbian Battle Championship 29
|
|align=center|3
|align=center|5:00
|Novi Sad, Serbia
|
|-
|Win
|align=center|17–10–2
|Danillo Santos	
|Submission (guillotine choke)
|Serbian Battle Championship 27
|
|align=center|2
|align=center|0:59
|Vrbas, Serbia
|
|-
|Loss
|align=center|
|João Zeferino	
|Decision (unanimous)
|PFL 4
|
|align=center|3
|align=center|5:00
|Atlantic City, New Jersey, United States
|
|- 
|Loss
|align=center|16–9–2
|Handesson Ferreira	
|Decision (unanimous)
|PFL 1
|
|align=center|3
|align=center|5:00
|Uniondale, New York, United States
|
|- 
|Loss
|align=center|16–8–2
|Magomed Magomedkerimov
|TKO (punches)
|rowspan=2|PFL 10
|rowspan=2|
|align=center|2
|align=center|3:13
| rowspan=2 |Washington, D.C., United States
|
|- 
|Draw
|align=center|16–7–2
|Abubakar Nurmagomedov
|Draw (unanimous)
|align=center|2
|align=center|5:00
|
|-
|Loss
|align=center|16–7–1
|Magomed Magomedkerimov
|Decision (unanimous)
|PFL 6
|
|align=center|3
|align=center|5:00
|Atlantic City, New Jersey, United States
|
|-
|Win
|align=center|16–6–1
|Jonatan Westin
|TKO (punches)
|PFL 3
|
|align=center|2
|align=center|2:50
|Washington, D.C., United States
|
|-
|Loss
|align=center|15–6–1
|Jake Matthews
|Decision (split)
|UFC Fight Night: Werdum vs. Tybura
|
|align=center|3
|align=center|5:00
|Sydney, Australia
|
|-
|Loss
|align=center|15–5–1
|Darren Till
|Decision (unanimous)
|UFC Fight Night: Volkov vs. Struve 
|
|align=center|3
|align=center|5:00
|Rotterdam, Netherlands
|
|-
|Win
|align=center|15–4–1
|Nico Musoke
|KO (punches)
|UFC Fight Night: Gustafsson vs. Teixeira
|
|align=center|3
|align=center|4:37
|Stockholm, Sweden
|
|-
|Loss
|align=center|14–4–1
|Sultan Aliev
|Decision (split)
|UFC on Fox: VanZant vs. Waterson
|
|align=center|3
|align=center|5:00
|Sacramento, California, United States
|
|-
|Draw
|align=center|14–3–1
|Michael Graves
|Draw (majority)
|UFC 201
|
|align=center|3
|align=center|5:00
|Atlanta, Georgia, United States
|
|-
|Win
|align=center|14–3
|Alessio Di Chirico
|Decision (unanimous)
|UFC Fight Night: Rothwell vs. dos Santos
|
|align=center|3
|align=center|5:00
|Zagreb, Croatia
|
|-
|Win
|align=center|13–3
|Benjamin Smith
|Submission (guillotine choke)
|RFA 34: Veličković vs. Smith
|
|align=center|3
|align=center|1:51
|Broomfield, Colorado, United States
|
|-
|Win
|align=center|12–3
|Vardan Sholinian
|Decision (unanimous)
|RFA 31: Smith vs. Marunde
|
|align=center|3
|align=center|5:00
|Las Vegas, Nevada, United States
|
|-
|Win
|align=center|11–3
|Charles Byrd
|Decision (unanimous)
|AXS TV Fights: RFA vs. Legacy Superfight
|
|align=center|3
|align=center|5:00
|Robinsonville, Mississippi, United States
|
|-
|Win
|align=center|10–3
|Chris Hugh
|TKO (punches)
|RFA 24: Smith vs. Romero
|
|align=center|1
|align=center|4:40
|Prior Lake, Minnesota, United States
|
|-
|Loss
|align=center|9–3
|Gilbert Smith
|Decision (majority)
|RFA 20: Sanders vs. Mercado
|
|align=center|3
|align=center|5:00
|Broomfield, Colorado, United States
|
|-
|Win
|align=center|9–2
|Nikolay Aleksakhin
|Submission (guillotine choke)
|Tesla FC 4
|
|align=center|2
|align=center|2:35
|Pančevo, Serbia
|
|-
|Loss
|align=center|8–2
|Krzysztof Jotko
|Decision (majority)
|MMA Attack 3
|
|align=center|3
|align=center|5:00
|Katowice, Poland
|
|-
|Win
|align=center|8–1
|Tomáš Kužela
|Submission (rear-naked choke)
|MMA Attack 3
|
|align=center|2
|align=center|N/A
|Prague, Czech Republic
|
|-
|Win
|align=center|7–1
|Jiří Procházka
|TKO (punches)
|Supreme FC 1: Balkan Fighter Night
|
|align=center|1
|align=center|N/A
|Belgrade, Serbia
|
|-
|Loss
|align=center|6–1
|Svetlozar Savov
|Decision (split)
|WFC 17 - Olimp: Live & Fight
|
|align=center|3
|align=center|N/A
|Ljubljana, Slovenia
|
|-
|Win
|align=center|6–0
|Marko Lukačić
|Submission (rear-naked choke)
|Tesla FC 2
|
|align=center|1
|align=center|N/A
|Belgrade, Serbia
|
|-
|Win
|align=center|5–0
|Jason Lee
|KO (punches)
|Ring of Fire 41: Bragging Rights
|
|align=center|1
|align=center|1:39
|Broomfield, Colorado, United States
|
|-
|Win
|align=center|4–0
|Nemanja Uverić
|Submission (guillotine choke)
|Tesla FC 1
|
|align=center|2
|align=center|N/A
|Belgrade, Serbia
|
|-
|Win
|align=center|3–0
|Svetislav Nikolajev
|Submission (armbar)
|Tesla FC 1
|
|align=center|2
|align=center|N/A
|Belgrade, Serbia
|
|-
|Win
|align=center|2–0
|Marko Ignjatović
|Submission (heel hook)
|Ring of Fire Europe 2/3
|
|align=center|1
|align=center|2:57
|Subotica, Serbia
|
|-
|Win
|align=center|1–0
|Vladimir Jovanović
|Submission (armbar)
|Ring of Fire Europe 2/3
|
|align=center|1
|align=center|3:59
|Subotica, Serbia
|

References

External links
 
 

Living people
Serbian male mixed martial artists
1988 births
Sportspeople from Novi Sad
Welterweight mixed martial artists
Mixed martial artists utilizing Muay Thai
Mixed martial artists utilizing judo
Mixed martial artists utilizing Brazilian jiu-jitsu
Ultimate Fighting Championship male fighters
Serbian Muay Thai practitioners
Serbian practitioners of Brazilian jiu-jitsu
Serbian male judoka